Derick Brownell is a retired American soccer defender who played professionally in the USISL and World Indoor Soccer League.

Youth
Born in New York, Brownell grew up in Arizona, graduating from Brophy College Preparatory. After participating as a member of the 1990 Brophy team which finished runner-up in the Arizona state soccer final, Brownell attended Santa Clara University where he played on the men's soccer team from 1992 to 1995 and graduated with a bachelor's degree in economics. He is currently married to Megan Brownell and has two children.

Professional
On March 4, 1996, the San Jose Clash selected Brownell in the second round (thirteenth overall) of the 1996 MLS College Draft.  The Clash sent him on loan to the California Jaguars of the USISL for the entire season.  He was selected to the USISL All Select Team with the Jaguars.  When the Clash released Brownell at the end of the season, the Carolina Dynamo signed him for the 1997 USISL season, but released Brownell in May 1997.  He then signed with the Charleston Battery where he played until 2000.  Brownell also played for the Arizona Thunder in the World Indoor Soccer League.

References

External links
 Charleston Battery: Derick Brownell

1974 births
Living people
American soccer players
Soccer players from Arizona
Arizona Thunder players
California Jaguars players
North Carolina Fusion U23 players
Charleston Battery players
San Jose Earthquakes players
Tucson Fireballs players
USISL Select League players
World Indoor Soccer League players
A-League (1995–2004) players
Santa Clara Broncos men's soccer players
San Jose Earthquakes draft picks
USL Second Division players
Association football defenders